Application Control Management System (Application Control and Management System) (ACMS) is a transaction processing monitor software system for computers running the OpenVMS operating system.

ACMS was developed by Digital Equipment Corporation in the early 1980s as part of an effort to gain market share in commercial applications. (Digital's initial strength was in scientific computing.) ACMS was originally released in 1984 as part of the integrated VAX Information Architecture product set along with Rdb (relational database system), DBMS (CODASYL database system), TDMS (original forms system), DECforms (a newer forms system), CDD (Common Data Dictionary), and DATATRIEVE (query and report writer for record-oriented files and databases). ACMS pioneered many transactional RPC and abstraction concepts, and remains a popular TP monitor for the OpenVMS environment.

External links 
 ACMS Product Page

OpenVMS software
Transaction processing